The Holy Angels' Convent Higher Secondary School is one of the oldest educational institutions in the city of Trivandrum/Thiruvananthapuram, the capital of the Kerala state in India.

History
This school for girls was opened on 10 November 1880 by Mother Elias from Ireland. She was the foundress of the Congregation of the Carmelite Religious (C.C.R).

In 1888, the school secured the honour of being the first girls' school in South India which presented students for the Matriculation Examination of Madras University. In 1896, the school was upgraded to a second-grade college. But this college section was closed in 1906.

Present day
The school boasts of a strength of over 6000 students, mostly girls. Admission to the boys is restricted up to the IV standard. Even though both English and Malayalam are used as the media for instruction, senior students speak only English within the campus. The school has a library of over 20,000 books, a fully equipped and upgraded computer labs, laboratory facilities, huge sprawling buildings and beautiful gardens. Boarding facilities are also available here.

This school has a house system which include four houses viz Blue, Green, Yellow and Red. This housing system increases the efficiency of students in curricular as well as extracurricular activities.

Notable alumni
 Vidhu Prathap
 Divya S. Iyer
 Asha Sinha
 Pearle Maaney
 Nyla Usha
 Ahaana Krishna
 Mary Poonen Lukose
 Annie (actress)
 Arya (actress)
 Aishwarya Lekshmi

References

Girls' schools in Kerala
Boarding schools in Kerala
Christian schools in Kerala
High schools and secondary schools in Thiruvananthapuram
Private schools in Thiruvananthapuram
Educational institutions established in 1880
1880 establishments in British India